The Seoul Metropolitan City roads are a system of highways spanning the metropolitan area of Seoul. Urban municipalities maintain and designate highway routes. The numbering system of Seoul is different from other systems, as they use an official number and guide number. The official numbering system is used in the legal system only, while the guide numbering system is used for the signage system and widely by citizens.

Classification 
There are three types of Seoul Metroplitan City roads: urban expressways, trunk routes, and auxiliary routes.

Urban expressways 
There are 10 routes; some overlap with other routes.

Other guided routes

Trunk routes

Auxiliary routes

Three-digit routes

2000-3000 series 

Roads in South Korea
Roads in Seoul